Westerdahl is a surname. Notable people with the surname include:

Eduardo Westerdahl (1902–1983), Spanish painter, art critic and writer
Fanny Westerdahl (1817–1873), Swedish stage actress
Kalle Westerdahl (born 1966), Swedish actor
Stellan Westerdahl (1935–2018), Swedish sailor